The Skaftö Open is a professional golf tournament on the Ladies European Tour (LET). 

The tournament is played in Sweden at Skaftö Golf Club in Fiskebäckskil, north of Gothenburg. It was first played on the Swedish Golf Tour in 2018, before being elevated to the LET Access Series in 2019 and to the LET in 2021, the second of three LET events in Sweden that season. 

The 2020 event was withdrawn from the LET Access Series schedule and played as part of the newly established Nordic Golf Tour due to the COVID-19 pandemic.

Winners

Source:

References

External links
Ladies European Tour

Ladies European Tour events
Golf tournaments in Sweden